Il fidanzamento (The Engagement) is a 1975 Italian romantic comedy-drama film directed by Giovanni Grimaldi. It is based on the novel with the same name written by Goffredo Parise.

Plot  
Catania. Luigi Manozzi is a public official who has been engaged for 8 years to Mirella Guglielmi, whom he treats as the object of his sexual desires without however deciding to marry her. Mussia, the girl's mother, aware of her daughter's situation, constantly teases Luigi to push him to do his duty, even though the girl does not need to contract a shotgun marriage.

After being caught red-handed during coitus, Luigi slips away from Mirella's family for fear of being cornered by Mussia who, instead of blaming him for the fait accompli, proposes to help him financially; having no other arguments to procrastinate, Luigi works on a pretext to be transferred to L'Aquila while waiting for the situation to evolve in his favor.

Fearing the final bachelorette party of her daughter, Mussia with the help of her sister Elide tries to facilitate a new engagement between Mirella and a peer, Lucio Davossa. Luigi is informed by his friend and colleague Totò of what is happening in his ex-girlfriend's family and with a devious maneuver, he breaks the bond just established between Mirella and Lucio.

With the death of Edmondo Guglielmi, Mirella's father, Luigi is taken into consideration by Mussia as a matter of comfort, always with the intention of pushing him to marry his daughter, counting on the fact that sooner or later, Mirella can get pregnant. At the end of the ordeal that saw, among a thousand subterfuges and vicissitudes, Luigi, Mirella and her family, the two finally contract the hoped-for marriage, even if, for a few moments, all those present at the ceremony remain in suspense because of the undaunted hesitation by Luigi.

Cast 

 Lando Buzzanca: Luigi Mannozzi 
 Martine Brochard: Mirella Guglielmi 
 Didi Perego: Elide  
 Anna Proclemer: Mussia Katiuscia 
 Michele Abruzzo: Edmondo Guglielmi 
 Carlo Sposito: Totò 
 Gabriele Antonini: Lucio Davossa 
 Antonia Brancati: Maria Pia 
 Ennio Balbo: Monsignor Solinas 
 Riccardo Garrone: Vincenzo 
 Daniela Giordano: Lina

See also       
 List of Italian films of 1975

References

External links

1975 films
Italian comedy films
1975 comedy films
Films directed by Giovanni Grimaldi
Films scored by Piero Umiliani
1970s Italian films